Wang Mi (died 311), courtesy name Zigu, was a Chinese bandit leader and military general of Han Zhao during the Western Jin dynasty. He participated in a rebellion led by Liu Bogen during the War of the Eight Princes but after it was quelled, he fled to Mount Zhangguang where he became a notorious outlaw and was given the nickname "Flying Leopard". After two years of banditry, he joined the Xiongnu king, Liu Yuan and his state of Han Zhao in 308. He became one of the state's most important commanders in their war against Jin, playing a crucial role in capturing Luoyang during the Disaster of Yongjia. However, Wang Mi's career was cut short after he was assassinated by his peer and rival Shi Le in 311.

Early life 
Wang Mi's family came from a line of officials in Donglai Commandery in the Jiaodong Peninsula. His grandfather, Wang Qi, was the Administrator of Xuantu during the Cao Wei period who greatly contributed in the Goguryeo-Wei War and participated in the conquest of Wei's rival state, Shu Han. In his youth, he was noted to be brave and well-versed, surrounding himself with books and records. He also once worked as a knight-errant (Youxia 遊俠), offering his service around Luoyang. During the reign of Emperor Wu of Jin, Wang Mi was appointed as Grand Administrator of Runan. A hermit by the name of Dong Zhong (董仲) encountered Wang Mi on the road and said to him, “My Lord speaks like a wolf and looks like a leopard. Excellent in confusion, happy with misfortune, assumes all under heaven is disturbed and agitated. Not the acts of a scholar and nobleman!”

Liu Bogen's rebellion 
During the War of the Eight Princes in 306, the Prefect of Jian County (惤縣, near Longkou, Shandong), Liu Bogen (劉柏根) staged a revolt in Donglai. Hearing this, Wang Mi brought his followers along with him in order to join the rebellion and he was appointed as Bogen's Chief Clerk. The rebels invaded the capital of Qingzhou in Linzi and the commander of Qingzhou, Sima Lue (司馬略) sent Liu Tun (劉暾) to quell the rebellion. However, the rebels managed to defeat Tun and Sima Lue was forced out of Qingzhou.   

Despite the rebellion's initial success, it soon fell apart the same year with the intervention of the Youzhou warlord Wang Jun. In the wake of Sima Lue's defeat, Wang Jun attacked Liu Bogen in order to aid Lue in recovering his territories. Bogen was killed in battle and Wang Mi decided to lead the remaining forces to the small islets in the east. However, on his way, he was intercepted and defeated by Gou Chun (苟纯). Wang Mi survived the attack and fled to Mount Zhangguang (長廣山; in present-day Pingdu, Shandong) instead to become a bandit.

As a bandit leader

Invasion of Qingzhou and Xuzhou 
During his time as an outlaw, Wang Mi led many raids in Qingzhou against its people. His notoriety earned him the name "Flying Leopard (飛豹)" by the locals. The following year in 307, Wang Mi invaded Qingzhou and Xuzhou. He declared himself Grand General Who Conquers the East and executed any official he could find. The emperor’s regent, Sima Yue, sent Ju Xian (鞠羨) to repel Wang Mi but Wang defeated and killed him. The Inspector of Yanzhou, Gou Xi, was then sent instead and Wang Mi’s forces were routed.

Siege of Luoyang (308) 
After his recent defeat, Wang Mi decided to submit to Liu Yuan of Han Zhao. Liu Yuan accepted his submission and appointed him the Duke of Donglai, Inspector of Qingzhou and Great General who Garrisons the East. With a state now backing him up, he gathered his scattered forces and raised his troops' morale. In 308, he sent out several of his generals to pillage Qingzhou, Xuzhou, Yanzhou and Yuzhou where they killed many of the regions' administrators and prefects. Gou Xi fought Wang Mi's forces multiple time, but this time he could not overcome them. Soon, Wang Mi reached the city of Xuchang, where he emptied the city's arsenal of weapons and equipment in order to rearm his troops. With his momentum looking unstoppable, Wang Mi set his eyes on Luoyang.

As Wang Mi's army marched towards the capital, Sima Yue sent his Marshal, Wang Bin (王斌), in order to defend the capital. The governor of Liangzhou, Zhang Gui, also sent his general Beigong Chun (北宮純) to reinforce the city. When Wang Mi finally arrived at Luoyang, the Minister Over the Masses, Wang Yan, was appointed to command the army against him. The defences of Luoyang succeeded in overwhelming and driving away Wang Mi. Wang Mi burned the city gates before retreating, but Wang Yan sent Wang Bing (王秉) to pursue him and he was defeated once more at Seven Li Gully (七里澗).

Service under Han Zhao

During Liu Yuan's reign 
After failing to capture Luoyang, Wang Mi went to formally join Han Zhao. Liu Yuan and Wang Mi had once befriended each other in their youths during their time in Luoyang. Thus, when Liu Yuan heard that Wang Mi was coming to join him, he welcomed Wang with opened arms. Upon meeting Liu Yuan, Wang urged him to declare himself as emperor, which Liu would eventually do later that year. Liu Yuan offered Wang Mi a number of posts as part of his welcome but Wang Mi declined them all.

Under Han, Wang Mi was first tasked in accompanying Liu Yao in invading Henei before joining with Shi Le to attack Linzhang in 308. After that, he and Shi Le besieged Ye, causing the local commander He Yu (和郁) to abandon the city. Emperor Huai sent Pei Xian (裴憲) to camp at Baima (白馬; near present-day Hua County, Henan) to defend against Wang Mi. 

The next year, Wang Mi was appointed to a number of important posts; Palace Attendant, Chief Controller of Qingzhou, Xuzhou, Yanzhou, Yuzhou, Jizhou, and Yangzhou and Governor of Qingzhou. After that, he was sent to campaign against the Inspector of Bingzhou, Liu Kun, to capture Huguan county from his territory together with Liu Cong and Shi Le. In order to support Liu Kun, Sima Yue sent Wang Kuang (王曠) and others to attack Wang Mi but Wang greatly routed them. Meanwhile, Liu Cong and Shi Le defeated Liu Kun's forces and captured Huguan.

Later that year, Wang Mi participated in Liu Yuan's campaign in Luoyang under Liu Cong. Although Luoyang was poorly defended, the campaign went badly for the Han forces as several of their generals were killed during the assault. Wang Mi advised Liu Cong to retreat as their supplies were beginning to run low, but Liu did not dare to do so without his father's permission. It was not until Liu Yuan recalled his forces that they could retreat, ending the siege in failure.

Later that year, Wang Mi marched his troops south through Huanyuan Pass (轘轅, located approximately 3 kilometers northwest of the Shaolin Monastery in Henan) to invade Xiangcheng commandery but he was defeated by Bao Sheng (薄盛) at Xinji (新汲, in modern Fugou County, Henan). However, at the same time, many refugees in Yingchuan, Xiangcheng, Runan, Nanyang, and Henan commanderies were rebelling in order to join Wang Mi. These refugees, who initially fled to escape the fighting, were discriminated against by the local populace. In order to show their loyalty to Wang Mi, they set fire to the towns and cities and killed the chief clerks and local officials.  

Shortly after, Wang Mi petitioned Liu Yuan so that his Chief Clerk of the Left, Cao Ni, could be appointed General Who Maintains The East in Qingzhou, where he would provide security to Wang's family's members. The next year, Wang Mi followed Shi Le in invading Xuzhou, Yuzhou and Yanzhou, routing many of the local generals.

Disaster of Yongjia 

Later that year, Liu Yuan died and although his son Liu He succeeded him, He was quickly assassinated by his brother, Liu Cong, making Cong the new emperor only seven days into He's reign. Liu Cong was determined to capture Luoyang, so he sent Liu Can, Liu Yao, Wang Mi and Shi Le to march towards the capital. Wang Mi joined Liu Yao in order to attack Xiangcheng before marching towards Luoyang. Luoyang had barely survived the year before, but conditions in the city had worsened through famines, bandits, and mistrust among the inhabitants of the city. After the death of Sima Yue, Emperor Huai of Jin's new paramount general, Gou Xi, waited for his arrival at Cangyuan (倉垣, in modern Kaifeng, Henan), leaving Luoyang vulnerable to the Han forces. In 311, Liu Cong sent Huyan Yan to besiege the capital and ordered Wang Mi, Liu Yao and Shi Le to join him. Wang Mi arrived at Luoyang and met up with Huyan Yan. They entered the palace, sacking it and capturing many of the palace's servants. Emperor Huai of Jin, who was still in the capital, was caught and sent to Han's capital in Pingyang.

Although Han had won a very important victory over Jin, Wang Mi would get into a dispute with Liu Yao. Liu Yao resented Wang for entering the capital before he had and sacking the capital despite having given orders not to do so. As punishment, Liu Yao beheaded his General of the Serrated Gate, Wang Yan (王延). The two men traded blows with each other because of this, leaving thousands of their men dead before Wang Mi's Chief Clerk Zhang Song (張嵩) advised him to reconcile with Liu Yao, to which Wang Mi agreed and Liu Yao accepted his apology. However, they quarreled again after Wang Mi advised Yao to persuade Liu Cong to move Han's capital from Pingyang to Luoyang. Yao refused to listen, and instead burned the city down. Angered, Wang Mi scolded him, "You Tuge brat, is this how a king or an emperor acts?" Not wanting to escalate it further, Wang Mi returned to Qingzhou.

Death 
Wang Mi had long been friends with his colleague, Shi Le, but deep down they were both very suspicious of one another. Shi Le had covertly caught and killed Wang Mi's subordinate Liu Tun who was on his way to inform Cao Ni that he should rally his troops against Shi. Furthermore, Wang Mi's generals Xu Miao (徐邈) and Gao Liang (高梁) had abandoned him with their troops for Cao Ni. When Wang Mi heard that Shi Le had caught his adversary Gou Xi, he wrote a letter to Shi Le seemingly praising him but subtly patronising him. Wang Mi also sent to Shi Le women and treasures that he had captured and looted at Luoyang as gifts in order to win him over. Shi Le was not amused but his advisor Zhang Bin told him that he should wait until Wang Mi's forces had truly dwindled.  

Soon enough, Wang Mi was caught in a stalemate with an enemy general named Liu Rui (劉瑞). Shi Le was fighting Chen Wu (陳午) at the time but Zhang Bin told him to leave Chen and aid Wang Mi in order to win his trust. Shi Le agreed and helped Wang Mi overcome Liu Rui. Wang Mi was grateful for his assistance and no longer suspected him. After their victory, Shi Le invited Wang Mi over to a feast in Jiwu County (己吾縣, present-day Ningling County, Henan). Wang Mi complied despite Zhang Song's advising him not to. When Wang Mi became drunk at the feast, Shi Le personally beheaded him and absorbed his army.

After the death of Wang Mi, Shi Le sent Liu Cong a petition to justify his actions, calling Wang Mi a rebel. Although Liu Cong was very infuriated by Shi Le’s actions, he still wanted to ensure his loyalty to Han, so he gave no punishment to Shi Le and instead rewarded him with positions. Wang Mi's subordinate, Cao Ni, continued to maintain control over Qingzhou, where he would remain until his defeat by Shi Le's nephew, Shi Hu in 323.

Family 
It is not known what happened to Wang Mi's family after Cao Ni's defeat. However, a nephew of Wang Mi named Wang Li (王立), was found alive in 356. He, along with Cao Ni's grandson, Cao Yan (曹巖), were discovered living among the hills by Former Yan's minister, Ju Yin (鞠殷). Yin's father was Ju Peng (鞠彭), a general who had fought against Cao Ni in Donglai before fleeing to the Liaodong Peninsula to serve Murong Hui. In turn, Peng's father was Ju Xian, the Jin general whom Wang Mi had killed in 307. When Ju Yin was commissioned to govern Donglai, Peng urged his son to find Wang Mi and Cao Ni's descendants and befriend them so that they could properly resolve their conflict. Yin did so and the three men became very close friends, so much so that their bond was famous among the people of Donglai at the time.

References 

 Fang, Xuanling (ed.) (648). Book of Jin (Jin Shu)
 Sima, Guang (1084). Zizhi Tongjian

311 deaths
Jin dynasty (266–420) generals
Former Zhao generals